Ludvig Harboe (16 August 1709 – 15 June 1783) was a Danish theologian and bishop of the Diocese of Zealand from 1757 until his death.

Harboe was born at Broager Peninsula in Sønderborg, Denmark. He was mostly educated in Germany. He attended gymnasium in Hamburg, where he stayed for two years. Then he studied at the universities of Rostock, Wittenberg and Jena returning home to Broager during 1732. In 1738, Harboe was a priest at Garnisonskirken and in 1739 became a priest at Kastelskirken, both churches in Copenhagen.

Harboe was sent to Iceland in 1741 to inspect the state of the church there on behalf of the Church of Denmark. He initiated some reforms there and while there (in 1743) was appointed to the post of Bishop of the Diocese of Trondhjem. After returning to Copenhagen in 1745, he was consecrated as Bishop and soon left for Trondheim, the seat of his new diocese. He arrived in Trondheim on 1 July 1746 and served there for two more years before leaving the post and returning to Copenhagen.

After returning to Copenhagen in 1748, Harboe married Frederikke Louise Hersleb (1720-1780), the daughter of Peder Hersleb, Bishop of the Diocese of Zealand. He then worked with his new father-in-law in Denmark, and when Hersleb died in 1757, Harboe was appointed to replace him. He served there until his death in 1783.

References

1709 births
1783 deaths
18th-century Danish clergy
University of Copenhagen alumni
People from Sønderborg Municipality
18th-century Lutheran bishops
Danish Lutheran clergy
Bishops of Nidaros